JoAnne L. Hewett (born 1960) is a theoretical particle physicist on the faculty of the SLAC National Accelerator Laboratory at Stanford University, where she is a professor in the Department of Particle Physics and Astrophysics.  Since 2017 she has been the associate lab director of the Fundamental Physics Directorate and the chief research officer at SLAC. Her research interests include physics beyond the Standard Model, dark matter, and hidden dimensions. She is a fellow of the American Physical Society and a fellow of the American Association for the Advancement of Science (AAAS).

Early life and education 
JoAnne Lea Hewett, daughter of Robert and Jean Hewett, lived in Boulder, Colorado, Phoenix, Arizona, St. Louis, Missouri, and Bettendorf, Iowa, while growing up. She completed her undergraduate degree in physics and mathematics at Iowa State University in 1982, and earned her doctorate there in 1988. Her dissertation, advised by B.-L. Young, was titled, Superstring Inspired E(6) Phenomenology.

Career 
Hewett began her career as a postdoctoral associate from 1988 to 1991 at the University of Wisconsin-Madison and in 1991–1993 she worked as a physicist at Argonne National Laboratory. In 1994 she joined the faculty at SLAC National Accelerator Laboratory, where she is a professor in the SLAC Department of Particle Physics and Astrophysics.

Hewett has served on Program Advisory Committees of SLAC, Fermi National Accelerator Laboratory, Kavli Institute for Theoretical Physics, and the Cornell Electron Storage Ring. She currently chairs the High Energy Physics Advisory Panel and was a member of the panel in 2004–2006 and again in 2016;  in 2006 and 2014, she served on the Particle Physics Project Prioritization Panel;  and she served as chair of the APS Division of Particles and Fields in 2016.

Research 
Her research interests include models of physics beyond the Standard Model, emphasizing collider signatures and the interface with astroparticle physics. Hewett has worked on the "phenomenology of extra spatial dimensions, extended Higgs sectors, supersymmetry, new physics signatures in heavy flavor physics, dark matter, and the complementarity of experimental probes of dark matter". She has collaborated on the BaBar experiment and the International Linear Collider.

Honors 
Upon her election in 2007 as a fellow of the American Physical Society, Hewett was cited "For her contributions to our understanding of constraints on and searches for physics beyond the Standard Model, and service to the particle physics community leading studies of future experiments." She was elected in 2009 as a fellow of the American Association for the Advancement of Science.

References

External links 
 
 SLAC Spotlight Video Series, JoAnne L. Hewett - Theoretical Physics (video, 2:03 minutes)
 Hidden Dimensions and String Theory – Joanne Hewett (SETI Talks) (video, 1:09:26 hours)

1960 births
Living people
Particle physicists
Stanford University faculty
American women physicists
People from San Mateo, California
Iowa State University alumni
People from Bettendorf, Iowa
Fellows of the American Association for the Advancement of Science
Fellows of the American Physical Society
Physicists from Missouri
Scientists from St. Louis
21st-century American women